The Beacon Hill Monument is installed in Boston's Beacon Hill, in the U.S. state of Massachusetts.

References

External links
 
 Ashburton Park American Revolutionary War Memorial - Boston, MA at Waymarking

American Revolutionary War monuments and memorials
Beacon Hill, Boston
Monuments and memorials in Boston
Outdoor sculptures in Boston
Sculptures of birds in the United States